The 2002 California State Treasurer election occurred on November 5, 2002. The primary elections took place on March 5, 2002. The Democratic incumbent, Phil Angelides, defeated the Republican nominee, Greg Conlon.

Primary results
A bar graph of statewide results in this contest are available at https://web.archive.org/web/20080905210540/http://primary2002.ss.ca.gov/Returns/trs/00.htm.

Results by county are available here and here.

Republican

Candidates 
Greg Conlon, Businessman

Mary A. Toman

Others

Results

Results by county
Results from the Secretary of State of California:

See also
California state elections, 2002
State of California
California State Treasurer

References

External links
VoteCircle.com Non-partisan resources & vote sharing network for Californians
Information on the elections from California's Secretary of State

2002 California elections
California state treasurer elections
California